Omelianowicz-Ivan Pavlenko (born 31 August 1881 in Baku; died 8 September 1962 in Chicago) was a Ukrainian general army of the Ukrainian People's Republic.

Biography
He was a colonel of the Russian army and commander of the 8th Hussar Regiment. He was delegated to the Ukrainian Halic Army, where he became the commander of the group "Nawarija" fighting near Lviv during the Polish-Ukrainian War. After the conclusion of an alliance between the Polish and Ukrainian People's Republic, he was commander of the Independent Cavalry Division. He was responsible for the victory of the Battle of Sidorov.

During World War II, he cooperated with Nazi Germany. In 1941 he became commander of the 109th Schutzmannschaft Battalion.

He died in exile, buried in Bound Brooke Cemetery.

References 

Ukrainian military officers
1881 births
1962 deaths
Generals of the Ukrainian People's Republic
Ukrainian collaborators with Nazi Germany